Ashtian County is in Markazi province, Iran. The capital of the county is the city of Ashtian. At the 2006 census, the county's population was 19,011 in 5,669 households. The following census in 2011 counted 17,105 people in 5,536 households. At the 2016 census, the county's population was 16,357 in 5,582 households.

Administrative divisions

The population history of Ashtian County's administrative divisions over three consecutive censuses is shown in the following table. The latest census shows one district, three rural districts, and one city.

References

 

Counties of Markazi Province